Sarıkavak is a village in Çamlıyayla district of Mersin Province, Turkey. It is on the road connecting Çamlıyayla to Tarsus and Mersin. The population of the town is 828 as of 2012. The popular hiking course and the canyon Kisecik Canyon is to the west of the village. Sarıkavak is a typical agricultural village where vegetable and olive are the most important crops. Some residents also work in cotton fields around Tarsus, Mersin, and Adana.

References

Villages in Çamlıyayla District